Gornji Čajdraš (Cyrillic: Горњи Чајдраш) is a village in Central Bosnia and Herzegovina. It is located about 5 km west of City of Zenica on the regional road Zenica-Travnik.

Demographics 
Before the last war in Bosnia, Čajdraš had about 1,500 inhabitants. Majority of the population are Catholics-Croats, but there are some Muslims-Bosniaks and Orthodox-Serbs.

According to the 2013 census, its population was 664.

References

Populated places in Zenica